Adam Magri Overend (born 3 May 2000) is a Maltese footballer who plays for Floriana.

International career
He made his debut for the Malta national football team on 8 October 2021 in a World Cup qualifier against Slovenia.

References

External links
 
 

2000 births
Living people
Maltese footballers
Malta youth international footballers
Malta under-21 international footballers
Malta international footballers
Association football midfielders
St. Andrews F.C. players
St. Lucia F.C. players
Floriana F.C. players
Maltese Premier League players